Iffat al-Zaman Amin (1912 - 1977), also known as Iftikhar al-Tujjar, was a student and niece of Banu Amin, Iran's most prominent female religious scholar of the 20th century.

Iffat al-Zamān Amīn received an ijazah of riwāya in Najaf from Ayatollah Mahmoud Hashemi Shahroudi, who served as the Head of Judiciary of the Islamic Republic of Iran 1999-2009.

Among her works is "chehel hadith-e amin" (forty hadith of Amin), also known as "hashtsad
wa bist mou'ezeh".

Iffat al-Zamān Amīn's father was Aḥmad Amīn, the brother of Nusrat Amin's husband and cousin, Haj Mirza, also known as Muīn al-Tujjar, (d. 1950s). She also had a great grand aunt who was a mujtaheda, Hāshimīyah al-Tujjar.

See also
Lady Amin
Hashimiyah al-Tujjar
Zohreh Sefati
Zīnah al-Sādāt Humāyūnī

References

1912 births
20th-century Muslim scholars of Islam
1977 deaths
Women scholars of Islam
Iranian Shia scholars of Islam
Female Shia scholars of Islam